Gomphrena agrestis is a plant native to Cerrado vegetation in Brazil. This plant is cited in Flora Brasiliensis  by Carl Friedrich Philipp von Martius.

References

agrestis
Flora of Brazil
Flora of the Cerrado